The NCAA Division II Men's Ice Hockey Tournament was an annual tournament to determine the top men's ice hockey team in NCAA Division II from 1978 until 1984 and then again from 1993 until 1999. The Division II Championship was suspended following 1999, due to a lack of sponsoring schools. Most of the schools in Division II hockey became members of newly formed hockey conferences such as College Hockey America.  The Northeast Ten Conference is the last remaining Division II conference that sponsors ice hockey.

Champions

See also
NCAA Division I Men's Ice Hockey Championship
NCAA Division III Men's Ice Hockey Championship
National Collegiate Women's Ice Hockey Championship

References

Division II
College men's ice hockey in the United States
Ice hockey, men's